Natan Silveira Schulte (born February 20, 1992) is a Brazilian mixed martial artist who competes in the Lightweight division of the Professional Fighters League.

Background
Natan Schulte was born in Joinville, where he has family, and started training at the age of 14 in the city after constant bullying. His first professional fight was in 2011, but before that he had already fought more than 40 amateur fights, between muay thai, kickboxing and jiu-jitsu.

He was two-time champion of Santa Catarina and, at age 17, Brazilian champion. He even represented Brazil at the World Cup, in Serbia, but did not win the title.

Mixed martial arts career

Early career
Schulte began his professional MMA career in Brazil, where after winning his debut and losing his next two bouts, he rebounded to win his next 5 bouts and joined XFC International, an international promotion with a popular TV deal in Brazil and frequent live events. Shortly after joining XFCi, Schulte won the season one lightweight tournament. After winning a bout back on the Brazilian regionals, he faced Islam Mamedov at WSOF 35,on May 21, 2016, where he lost the bout at the end of the second round by the way of armbar submission.

Professional Fighters League

2018 Season 
After WSOF became PFL, Natan made his return his promotional debut against Chris Wade at PFL 2 on June 21, 2018, winning the bout via unanimous decision.

In his second fight in the tournament, Schulte was scheduled to face Brian Foster on August 2, 2018 at PFL 5, however Foster was forced to pull out and replaced by Jason High. He lost the fight via technical submission due to a rear-naked choke in the first round.

In the playoffs, Schulte was pitted against Johnny Case at PFL 9 on October 13, 2018. The bout ended in a majority draw, but Schulte advanced to the semi-finals and Case was eliminated from the tournament.

In the semifinals, Schulte faced Chris Wade again, winning the bout in a split decision and advancing to the tournament finals.

In the finals of the $1 million collective tournament, Schulte faced Rashid Magomedov at PFL 11 on December 31, 2018, winning the back-and-forth bout by a unanimous decision.

2019 Season 
Making his first appearance of the 2019 season on May 23, 2019 at PFL 2, Schulte submitted Yincang Bao by the way of rear-naked choke in the first round.

Schulte was expected to face Ramsey Nijem on July 25, 2019 at PFL 5, but Nijem could not make weight and was disqualified and removed from the card. Jesse Ronson replaced him and Schulte won the bout via unanimous decision.

In the quarter-finals of the tournament on October 17, 2019 at PFL 8, Schulte faced Ramsey Nijem, chocking him out in the first round with a rear-naked choke.

Advancing to the semi-finals, Schulte faced Akhmed Aliev in the same night, once again choking out his opponent, this time in the second round via arm-triangle choke.

In the finals on December 31, 2019 at PFL 10, Schulte faced Loik Radzhabov, winning the close bout and the tournament via unanimous decision.

2021 Season 
After a year off due to the cancellation of the 2020 season due to COVID, Schulte made his return against Marcin Held on April 23, 2021 at PFL 1. He lost the bout via unanimous decision.

Schulte was originally set to face Mikhail Odintsov on June 20, 2021 at PFL 4, however Odintsov pulled out of the bout due to injury and was replaced by Raush Manfio, in turn after bout cancellations on the card, Schulte was instead booked against undefeated Alexander Martinez. Schulte won the close bout via split decision.

2022 Season 
To start off the 2022 LW season, Schulte faced eventual 2022 Champion Olivier Aubin-Mercier on April 23, 2022 at PFL 1. He lost the close bout via split decision.

In the second regular season bout, Schulte faced Marcin Held on June 17, 2022 at PFL 4. He won the bout via unanimous decision, but didn't have enough points to advance to the playoffs.

Schulte faced Jeremy Stephens on November 25, 2022 at PFL 10. Schulte won the bout in the second round, submitting Stephens by arm-triangle choke.

Championships and accomplishments
Professional Fighters League
2019 PFL Lightweight Championship
2018 PFL Lightweight Championship
Xtreme Fighting Championships
Xtreme Fighting Championships Season 1 Lightweight Tournament

Mixed martial arts record

|-
| Win
| align=center|23–5–1
| Jeremy Stephens
|Submission (arm-triangle choke)
|PFL 10
|
|align=center|2
|align=center|1:32
|New York City, New York, United States
|
|-
| Win
| align=center|22–5–1
| Marcin Held
|Decision (unanimous)
|PFL 4
|
|align=center|3
|align=center|5:00
|Atlanta, Georgia, United States
|
|-
| Loss
| align=center|21–5–1
| Olivier Aubin-Mercier
|Decision (split)
|PFL 1
|
|align=center|3
|align=center|5:00
|Arlington, Texas, United States
|
|-
| Win
| align=center|21–4–1
| Alex Martinez
| Decision (split)
| PFL 4
| 
|align=center|3
|align=center|5:00
|Atlantic City, New Jersey, United States
|
|-
| Loss
| align=center|20–4–1
| Marcin Held
|Decision (unanimous)
|PFL 1
|
|align=center|3
|align=center|5:00
|Atlantic City, New Jersey, United States
|
|-
| Win
| align=center|20–3–1
| Loik Radzhabov
| Decision (unanimous)
| PFL 10
| 
| align=center|3
| align=center|5:00
| New York City, New York, United States
| 
|-
| Win
| align=center|19–3–1
| Akhmed Aliev
|Technical Submission (arm-triangle choke)
| rowspan=2 |PFL 8
| rowspan=2 |
|align=center|2
|align=center|2:26
|rowspan=2 |Las Vegas, Nevada, United States
|
|-
| Win
| align=center|18–3–1
| Ramsey Nijem
|Technical Submission (rear-naked choke)
|align=center| 1
|align=center| 0:52
|
|-
| Win
| align=center|17–3–1
| Jesse Ronson
|Decision (unanimous)
|PFL 5
|
|align=center|3
|align=center|5:00
|Atlantic City, New Jersey, United States 
|
|-
| Win
| align=center|16–3–1
| Yincang Bao
| Submission (rear-naked choke)
| PFL 2
| 
| align=center|1
| align=center|3:03
| |Uniondale, New York, United States
|
|-
| Win
| align=center|15–3–1
| Rashid Magomedov
|Decision (unanimous)
|PFL 11
|
|align=center|5
|align=center|5:00
|New York City, New York, United States 
|
|-
| Win
| align=center|14–3–1
| Chris Wade
|Decision (split)
| rowspan=2 |PFL 9
| rowspan=2 |
| align=center| 3
| align=center| 5:00
| rowspan=2 |Long Beach, California, United States
|
|-
|  Draw
| align=center|13–3–1
| Johnny Case
| Draw (majority)
| align=center| 2
| align=center| 5:00
|
|-
| Win
| align=center| 13–3
| Jason High
|Technical Submission (rear-naked choke)
|PFL 5
|
|align=center|1
|align=center|4:18
|Uniondale, New York, United States
|
|-
| Win
| align=center| 12–3
| Chris Wade
|Decision (unanimous)
|PFL 2
|
|align=center| 3
|align=center| 5:00
|Chicago, Illinois, United States
|
|-
| Loss
| align=center| 11–3
| Islam Mamedov
| Submission (armbar)
|WSOF 35
|
| align=center|2
| align=center|4:56
|Verona, New York, United States
| 
|-
| Win
| align=center|11–2
| Henerson Duarte
| Decision (unanimous)
| Max Fight 18
| 
| align=center|3
| align=center|5:00
| Varginha, Brazil
|
|-
| Win
| align=center|10–2
| Igor Egorov
| Submission (rear-naked choke)
| XFC International 9
| 
| align=center|1
| align=center|3:58
| São Paulo, Brazil
|
|-
| Win
| align=center|9–2
| Gláucio Eliziário
| Decision (unanimous)
| XFC International 5
| 
| align=center|3
| align=center|5:00
| São Paulo, Brazil
| 
|-
| Win
| align=center|8–2
| Gilson Lomanto
| TKO (punches)
| XFC International 4
| 
| align=center|1
| align=center|4:28
| São Paulo, Brazil
| 
|-
| Win
| align=center|7–2
| Giovanny Arroyo
| TKO (punches)
| XFC International 1
| 
| align=center|3
| align=center|2:26
| Osasco, Brazil
| 
|-
| Win
| align=center|6–2
| Rodrigo Basile
| Submission (guillotine choke)
| Nitrix Champion Fight 17
| 
| align=center|1
| align=center|0:33
| Balneário Camboriú, Brazil
| 
|-
| Win
| align=center| 5–2
| Daniel Hoffmann
| Submission (guillotine choke)
| Nitrix Champion Fight 15
| 
| align=center|1
| align=center|1:15
| Joinville, Brazil
|  
|-
| Win
| align=center| 4–2
| Sergio Barbosa
| Submission (guillotine choke)
| Paranagua Extreme Combate
| 
| align=center|2
| align=center|0:51
|Paranaguá, Brazil
|
|-
| Win
| align=center| 3–2
| Marcos Schmitz
| TKO (punches)
| Blufight 4
| 
| align=center| 3
| align=center| 3:55
| Blumenau, Brazil
| 
|-
| Win
| align=center| 2–2
| Josimar Cardoso
| Submission (guillotine choke)
| Bad Boy Fight Challenge 1
| 
| align=center|2
| align=center|2:28
| São José, Brazil
| 
|-
| Loss
| align=center| 1–2
| Pedro Gostinski Junior
| TKO (doctor stoppage)
| Nitrix Champion Fight 11
| 
| align=center|2
| align=center|5:00
| Joinville, Brazil
| 
|-
| Loss
| align=center| 1–1
| Yuri Maia
| Decision (unanimous)
| X-Fest 5
| 
| align=center|3
| align=center|5:00
| Porto Alegre, Brazil
|
|-
| Win
| align=center| 1–0
| Piero Severo
| TKO (front kick and punches)
| Monster Black Combat
| 
| align=center|2
| align=center|1:58
| Rio Grande, Brazil
|

See also 
 List of current PFL fighters
 List of male mixed martial artists

References

External links 
 

Brazilian male mixed martial artists
1992 births
Living people
Lightweight mixed martial artists
PFL male fighters